The 2018–19 Six Day Series (also known as the Six Day Cycling Series is a multi six-day track cycling race tournament over a season. It is the 3rd series organised by the Madison Sports Group (MSG). This season consists of 7 events across 5 countries.

It was the first edition of the World Cup to feature countries in Asia-Pacific. with two events held in Melbourne and Brisbane as the final in Australia. In January 2019, Hong Kong was announced as a new stage to introduce 6-day racing in Asia as the latest frontier. Those three stages were raced during 3-day weekends instead of the standard 6-day format.

Series 
In August 2018 the MSG revealed the location and dates of the Six Day Series meetings for the season. Six rounds were scheduled in London, United Kingdom; Berlin, Germany; Copenhagen, Denmark; Melbourne, Australia; Manchester and Brisbane. In January, a round in Hong Kong was added into the schedule.

London, United Kingdom 
Round 1 was held at the Lee Valley VeloPark, on October 23-28 October 2018. Completed in 2011, the velodrome was the site of the 2012 Olympic Games and 2012 Paralympic Games track events. It has hosted the UCI Track Cycling World Cup (2011-12, 2014-15), and the 2016 UCI Track Cycling World Championships. The 6750-capacity velodrome has also been used for the British Revolution track series, British National Track Championships and was the site of Sir Bradley Wiggins' successful Hour Record ride in 2015.

Berlin, Germany 
Round 2, to be held in Velodrom from January 24-29 January 2019. The velodrome was designed by internationally-renowned French architect Dominique Perrault for Berlin's 2000 Olympic Games bid. It was built in 1997 on the site of the former Werner-Seelenbinder-Halle. Since opening, it has played host to the 2017 European Track Championships, the 1998 UCI Track Cycling World Cup Classics and the 1999 UCI Track Cycling World Championships. Since 1997, the traditional Six Days of Berlin has also taken place here. In preparation for the 2017 European Track Championships, the track was rebuilt.

Copenhagen, Denmark 
Denmark's Ballerup Super Arena is situated in the capital. It will host the third round, on January 31-February 5. The velodrome was completed in 2001 and hosted the 2002 UCI Track Cycling World Championships and 2010 UCI Track Cycling World Championships. It can hold 6,500 spectators.

Melbourne, Australia 
The fourth round will be hosted on between 7-9 February at the Melbourne Arena. It hosted the UCI Track Cycling World Championships (2004, 2012), in addition to the 2006 Commonwealth Games track events and numerous rounds of the UCI Track World Cup.

Hong Kong 
The fifth round of this Six Day Series will be hosted in Hong Kong between 8-10 March at the Hong Kong Velodrome. Opened in 2013, the velodrome hosted the final round of the UCI Track Cycling World Cup (2015-16, 2018-19), as well as the 2017 UCI Track Cycling World Championships, which is the first one in Asia in the 21st Century. It has permanent seating for 2,000 spectators, expandable to 3,000 for events such as the World Cup.

Manchester, United Kingdom 
The sixth round was hosted in Manchester, a big northwestern city of the United Kingdom. This round will be held between 22-24 March. The Manchester Velodrome was completed in 1994 and is the home of British Cycling's National Cycling Centre. The Manchester Velodrome already hosted the 2002 Commonwealth Games, UCI Track Cycling World Championships (1996, 2000, 2008), British National Track Championships and Revolution Cycling series.

Brisbane, Australia 
The final would be held in Brisbane, Eastern city in Queensland during 12-14 April. Anna Meares Velodrome was completed in 2016 and named after Olympic gold medallist Anna Meares. It hosted the track cycling events at the 2018 Commonwealth Games. Offices of Cycling Queensland are incorporated in the velodrome.

Format 
The men compete in teams of two across the six days and women’s event across three days for the first three rounds. Sprinters will also compete for 6 days. There are certain differences in the races between 6 Day Series and UCI Track Cycling World Cup and UCI Track Cycling World Championships

The following events will be raced in the series:
 Derny, men
 Team elimination, men and women
 Sprint finals, men and women
 Keirin, men and women
 200m flying time trial, men and women
 Omnium, women
 The Longest lap, men
 Lap Record, men and women
 Madison, men and women 
 2 Lap madison time trial, men
 10 km scratch race, women

Results

Men

Women

Sprinters (Men)

Sprinters (Women)

Series Standings 
At the end of each Six Day event the Series Standings are updated. Riders are aiming to secure enough points throughout the Series to reach the Six Day Final in Brisbane and a chance to be crowned 2018/19 Series Champions.

Men

Women

References

External links 
 Six Day Series
 Six Day Hong Kong

Six Day Series
Six Day Series
Six Day Series
Six Day Series
Six Day Series
Six Day Series
Six Day Series
Six Day Series
Six Day Series